Katekyō Hitman Reborn! Dream Hyper Battle! is an action/combat title for the Wii and PlayStation 2 based upon the manga and anime series Reborn!. There are two versions of the game: the PlayStation 2 version, released earlier, covers the Kokuyo arc, while the Wii version covers through the Vongola Rings arc. The game was not released outside of Japan.

Gameplay
At the outset of a match, the player is to choose a hero and then two other supporters who make up a "family". They are to provide offensive support during a match to perform a combination attack. There are 100 different types in the game. There are little available characters in the start but additional choices are unlocked during the course of gameplay.

During "Episode Mode", the player(s) watch as others speak with Tsuna. After a scene is finished, the player will be instructed to choose a path to bring Tsuna to another character. This is to be done until the player encounters an opponent, which will trigger a battle. These interactive scenes with dialogue are accompanied by voice acting.

Story
The plot covers the Kokuyo arc, Mukuro and his subordinates escape from a prison and are after Tsunayoshi Sawada and his family. The Wii version included the Mukuro arc along with the Vongola Ring arc. A man named Xanxus is after the title of the tenth boss of Vongola and hosts the Vongola ring battle tradition. Whoever wins the most rings will become the family of the 10th generation of the Vongola.

References

National Console Support, Inc.| Kateikyoushi Hitman Reborn! Dream Hyper Battle! Wii

2007 video games
PlayStation 2 games
Reborn!
Wii games
Japan-exclusive video games
Organized crime video games
Video games scored by Yuzo Koshiro
Video games developed in Japan